Empfingen is a municipality in the district Freudenstadt in Baden-Württemberg in southern Germany.

Empfingen itself comprises two local districts, Wiesenstetten and Dommelsberg. Empfingen is close to the federal motorway 81 Stuttgart – Singen (A 81).

Twin towns 
 La Roche-Blanche, France.

Events 
 Beatparade

References 

Freudenstadt (district)